Camay Calloway Murphy (born January 15, 1927) is a retired American educator. The daughter of Jazz bandleader and singer Cab Calloway, Murphy was one of the first African-Americans to teach in white schools in Virginia. As an educator, Murphy emphasized music and multiculturalism. She founded the Cab Calloway Jazz Institute and Museum at Coppin State University. She was also the chairman of Baltimore's Eubie Blake National Jazz Institute and Cultural Center and commissioner of Baltimore City Public Schools' Board of Education.

Life and career 
Camay Calloway was born to Cab Calloway and Zelma Proctor at Harlem Hospital in New York on January 15, 1927. Her teenaged parents were not married, they met while attending high school in Baltimore, Maryland. The pregnancy was kept a secret and Proctor was sent to New York to give birth. After staying with some relatives for a while, she returned to Baltimore.

Her mother eventually returned to New York and Calloway was brought up by her maternal grandmother Viola Proctor who worked at Poindexter's Beauty Salon, owned by her sister-in-law Bertha Pointdexter. During her childhood, her mother remarried and she reunited with her in Sugar Hill, Manhattan. She has a younger half-brother, Ralph, a retired physician. Growing up, she took piano lessons but she wanted to become a journalist. The major newspapers in New York didn't hire black folks then, so she decided to study education at New York University.

After she earned her B.A. from New York University in 1950, she was hired as a teacher at Burgundy Farm County Day School in Alexandria, Virginia, becoming one of the first African-Americans to teach in white schools in Virginia. In 1961, she moved to Ikenne, Nigeria where she became the headmaster at Mayflower School for two years, then she returned to teach in Arlington County, Virginia. She began teaching in the Arlington school system in 1965 as one of the first African-American teachers at predominantly white Abingdon and Oakridge elementary schools. She later served as the Arlington County's early childhood education specialist.

In 1968, she became the supervisor of Arlington Public Schools for a decade. In 1978, she became principal at Ashlawn Elementary School where she remained until her retirement in 1993. During her tenure as principal, she opened a black heritage museum at Ashlawn, and the school was recognized as a National Blue Ribbon School.

In 1994, Murphy relocated to Baltimore to work as a cultural development consultant at Coppin State University. Her father died later that year and Murphy paid tribute to him by founding the Cab Calloway Jazz Institute and Museum at Coppin State University which promotes music education. She was also the chairman of Baltimore's Eubie Blake National Jazz Institute and Cultural Center. In 1999, she was appointed as commissioner of Baltimore City Public Schools' Board of Education.

Personal life 
Murphy moved to Washington, D.C. with her husband Booker T. Brooks in 1951. In 1955, she gave birth to her son Christopher William Brooks. Murphy and her son appeared on Edward R. Murrow's Person to Person with her father and his family in 1956. She later had another son, Peter Brooks. Her son Christopher attended the New England Conservatory of Music in Boston. As an undergrad, he transcribed and published the first written transcriptions of guitarists Joe Pass, Johnny Smith, and Wes Montgomery. He later taught guitar, and in 1998, he formed The Cab Calloway Orchestra in honor of his grandfather.

In 1980, she married John H. Murphy III, head of the Afro-American newspaper, in the St. Andrew Chapel of St. James Episcopal Church in Baltimore. Her husband died in 2010.

References

External links 

 Meet Camay Calloway Murphy
Camay Calloway Murphy on The History Makers

1927 births
People from Harlem
20th-century American educators
African-American schoolteachers
African-American music educators
American women music educators
Living people
New York University alumni
Writers from Baltimore
20th-century American women educators
20th-century African-American women
20th-century African-American people
20th-century African-American educators
21st-century African-American people
Murphy family
21st-century African-American women